is a traditional school (koryū) of the Japanese martial art of jujutsu. Its syllabus comprises atemi-waza (striking techniques), nage-waza (throwing techniques), kansetsu-waza (joint locking techniques) and shime-waza (choking techniques). The style is focused on throws and sweeps, and many of these techniques are designed to be performed while in full armor.

Origin

Kitō Ryū is translated as "the school of the rise and fall." It is similar to forms of "Aikijutsu,"  including the principle of "ki" (energy) and aiki (Kitō Ryū teaches that "When two minds are united, the stronger controls the weaker"...). Equally, it uses principles such as "kuzushi no ri" or "breaking of balance" now associated with modern judo.

Base art of Judo
Jigoro Kano trained in Kitō-ryū and derived some of the principles that were to form the basis of modern judo from this style. Judo's Koshiki-no-kata is based on Kitō-ryū.
Since Kano Jigoro got the Kitō-ryū densho from his Sensei, Judo is the current Kitō-ryū official successor.
Modified safer versions of Kitō-ryū throws form large part of Judo's Nagewaza (but without joint-locking throws).

Notes

External links
 https://web.archive.org/web/20070928065333/http://kiyojuteryu.org:8084/soke/articles/kitoryu.shtml

Jujutsu
Ko-ryū bujutsu
Japanese martial arts